Syntrichalonia is a genus of exquisite long-horned bees in the family Apidae. There are at least two described species in Syntrichalonia.

Species
These two species belong to the genus Syntrichalonia:
 Syntrichalonia exquisita (Cresson, 1878) (exquisite long-horned bee)
 Syntrichalonia fuliginea LaBerge, 1994

References

Further reading

 

Apinae
Articles created by Qbugbot